Frolovo is a rural locality (a village) in Tolshmenskoye Rural Settlement, Totemsky  District, Vologda Oblast, Russia. The population was 21 as of 2002.

Geography 
Frolovo is located 98 km south of Totma (the district's administrative centre) by road. Pervomaysky is the nearest rural locality.

References 

Rural localities in Totemsky District